Bewitched Bunny is a 1954 Warner Bros. Looney Tunes cartoon directed by Chuck Jones and written by Michael Maltese. The short was released on July 24, 1954, and stars Bugs Bunny. Jones created the character Witch Hazel who debuted in this cartoon.

Witch Hazel later appeared in Broom-Stick Bunny (1956), A Witch's Tangled Hare (1959), and in A-Haunting We Will Go (1966). She also has a brief cameo appearance in Transylvania 6-5000 (1963).

Plot 
The story begins with Bugs Bunny reading the classic fairy tale Hansel and Gretel. Witch Hazel plays the witch who tries to cook and eat the children (her cookbook has such recipes as "Waif Waffles", "Moppet Muffins", "Kiddie Kippers", "Children Chops", and "Smorgas Boy"). Bugs witnesses Witch Hazel coaxing the children inside. He comments that this looks like a job for the Masked Avenger, but he's not around. Bugs goes in her house, disguised as a truant officer, and saves the youths from her clutches. The children both turn to Hazel as they leave and say in a thick German accent: "Ach - your mother rides a vacuum cleaner!"

However, once Hazel realizes that Bugs is a rabbit, she tries to cook him instead, using a carrot (hollowed out and filled with a sleeping potion) as a lure. Bugs eats the carrot and falls asleep and Witch Hazel puts him into a roasting pan to make rabbit stew.

After the witch goes down into the basement to get something else, a character resembling Prince Charming enters the house and kisses Bugs' hand. Bugs wakes up and says: "You're looking for Snow White. This here's the story of HAHHN-sel and Gretel", and the Prince takes his leave, confused about how Hansel is pronounced. Then Hazel emerges from the basement and Bugs races down a nearby hallway to escape, but is trapped by Hazel. As she approaches, Bugs quickly finds a grenade full of her magic powder (in a case marked with the message "In case of emergency break glass") and uses it to transform her into a gorgeous female rabbit who has a feminine voice but still has Hazel's laugh.

As he gets ready to leave with the bunny beauty, Bugs looks at the audience, breaking the fourth wall, and comments: "Ah sure, I know. But aren't they all witches inside?".

Cast
 Mel Blanc as Bugs Bunny, Hansel and Prince Charming
 Bea Benaderet as Witch Hazel, Gretel and Female Rabbit (uncredited)

Controversy

This cartoon caused some controversy in Canada due to Bugs' ending line about Witch Hazel being turned into a rabbit being perceived as misogynistic. And Bugs' closing line, "Ah sure, I know, but aren't they all witches inside?" was edited out of commercial broadcasts in the 1980s, and was replaced in later versions with "Sure uh, I know, but after all, who wants to be alone on Halloween?", which was the re-dubbed line for the ending of Bewitched Bunny after it was repurposed in 1977's Bugs Bunny's Howl-oween Special. This controversy was briefly mentioned by Eric Goldberg on the DVD commentary of the fifth volume of the Looney Tunes Golden Collection DVD set. However, the original version has been aired in Canada (as recently as 2015) on the Canadian cable channel Teletoon Retro.

Home media
Bewitched Bunny is available on the second disc of Looney Tunes Golden Collection: Volume 5, and the first disc of Looney Tunes Spotlight Collection: Volume 5.

On HBO Max it appears as Season 19 Episode 20.

See also 
Lola Bunny

References

External links

 

1954 films
1954 animated films
1954 short films
Looney Tunes shorts
Warner Bros. Cartoons animated short films
American parody films
Fairy tale parody films
Short films directed by Chuck Jones
Films based on Hansel and Gretel
Films about witchcraft
Films scored by Carl Stalling
Animated films about animals
Bugs Bunny films
1950s Warner Bros. animated short films
Films with screenplays by Michael Maltese
1950s English-language films